Universal Market Integrity Rules (UMIR) are the set of rules governing financial market integrity in Canada that are defined by the Investment Industry Regulatory Organization of Canada (IIROC).

External links
Market Integrity Rules – UMIR, Investment Industry Regulation Organization of Canada.
Investment Industry Regulation Organization of Canada

Economy of Canada